The 2011 Vietnam Open Grand Prix (officially known as the Yonex-Sunrise Vietnam Grand Prix Open 2011 for sponsorship reasons) was a badminton tournament which took place at Phan Dinh Phung Stadium in Ho Chi Minh City, Vietnam, from 22 to 28 August and had a total purse of $50,000.

Tournament 
The 2011 Vietnam Open Grand Prix was the ninth Grand Prix's badminton tournament of the 2011 BWF Grand Prix Gold and Grand Prix and also part of the Vietnam Open championships which have been held since 1996. This tournament was organized by the Vietnam Badminton Federation, with the local organizer committee Ho Chi Minh City Badminton Association, and sanctioned by the Badminton World Federation.

This tournament attracted more than 300 players from 23 countries and territories to compete in 5 events: men's singles, women's singles, men's doubles, women's doubles and mixed doubles.

Venue 
This international tournament was held at the Phan Dinh Phung Stadium in District 1, Ho Chi Minh City, Vietnam.

Point distribution 
Below is the point distribution for each phase of the tournament based on the BWF points system for the BWF Grand Prix event.

Prize money 
The total prize money was US$50,000. Distribution of prize money was in accordance with BWF regulations.

Men's singles

Seeds 

  Nguyễn Tiến Minh (champion)
  Sho Sasaki (final)
  Tommy Sugiarto (withdrew)
  Alamsyah Yunus (quarter-finals)
  Ajay Jayaram (semi-finals)
  Chan Yan Kit (first round)
  Hsu Jen-hao (third round)
  Muhammad Hafiz Hashim (quarter-finals)
  Derek Wong (first round)
  Ashton Chen (third round)
  Liew Daren (quarter-finals)
  R. M. V. Gurusaidutt (semi-finals)
  Vladimir Malkov (second round)
  Keigo Sonoda (third round)
  Sony Dwi Kuncoro (third round)
  Pakkawat Vilailak (second round)

Finals

Women's singles

Seeds 

  Ratchanok Intanon (withdrew)
  Sayaka Sato (second round)
  Tai Tzu-ying (semi-finals)
  Ai Goto (first round)
  Gu Juan (first round)
  Aprilia Yuswandari (second round)
  Linda Zetchiri (first round)
  Maria Febe Kusumastuti (first round)

Finals

Men's doubles

Seeds 

  Hirokatsu Hashimoto / Noriyasu Hirata (quarter-finals)
  Naoki Kawamae / Shōji Satō (quarter-finals)
  Chen Hung-ling / Lin Yu-lang (quarter-finals)
  Gan Teik Chai / Tan Bin Shen (second round)
  Angga Pratama / Rian Agung Saputro (champions)
  Goh Wei Shem / Lim Khim Wah (semi-finals)
  Mak Hee Chun / Ong Soon Hock (semi-finals)
  Yohanes Rendy Sugiarto / Afiat Yuris Wirawan (quarter-finals)

Finals

Women's doubles

Seeds 

  Lotte Jonathans / Paulien van Dooremalen (second round)
  Shinta Mulia Sari / Yao Lei (final)
  Iris Wang / Rena Wang (second round)
  Leanne Choo / Renuga Veeran (first round)
  Anneke Feinya Agustin / Nitya Krishinda Maheswari (champions)
  Ng Hui Ern / Ng Hui Lin (first round)
  Chiang Kai-hsin / Tsai Pei-ling (semi-finals)
  Suci Rizky Andini / Della Destiara Haris (withdrew)

Finals

Mixed doubles

Seeds 

  Danny Bawa Chrisnanta / Vanessa Neo (semi-finals)
  Chayut Triyachart / Yao Lei (second round)
  Vitalij Durkin / Nina Vislova (champions)
  Arun Vishnu / Aparna Balan (quarter-finals)
  Muhammad Rizky Delynugraha / Richi Puspita Dili (second round)
  Leung Chun Yiu / Ng Ka Shun (first round)
  Irfan Fadhilah / Weni Anggraini (quarter-finals)
  Tan Aik Quan / Lai Pei Jing (semi-finals)

Finals

References

External links 
 Tournament Link

Vietnam Open (badminton)
Vietnam
Vietnam Open
Badminton Vietnam Open 2011
Vietnam Open